Between 2011 and 2017, fighting from the Syrian Civil War spilled over into Lebanon as opponents and supporters of the Syrian Arab Republic traveled to Lebanon to fight and attack each other on Lebanese soil. The Syrian conflict stoked a resurgence of sectarian violence in Lebanon, with many of Lebanon's Sunni Muslims supporting the rebels in Syria, while many of Lebanon's Shi'a Muslims supporting the Syrian government which is led by Bashar Al-Assad, whose Alawite minority is usually described as an offshoot of Shi'a Islam. Killings, unrest and sectarian kidnappings across Lebanon resulted.

The conflict arose in mid-2011, seven people were killed and 59 wounded in a fight between gunmen in Tripoli. In May 2012, the conflict spread to Beirut, and later to south and east Lebanon, while the Lebanese Armed Forces deployed in north Lebanon and Beirut. As of January 2016, there had been more than 800 fatalities and almost 3,000 injuries. Among Lebanon's political blocs, the Saudi-backed anti-Syrian March 14 Alliance supports the Syrian rebels, and the Iranian-backed pro-Syrian March 8 Alliance supports the Syrian government. On 28 August 2017, the last ISIL and Tahrir al-Sham remnants withdrew from Lebanon, ending the Syrian Civil War spillover in Lebanon.

Background

Since the Cedar Revolution in 2005 and the withdrawal of the occupying Syrian forces from the country, the Lebanese political spectrum has been divided between the anti-Syrian government 14 March alliance and the pro-Syrian government 8 March alliance. The 14 March alliance, led by the mainly Sunni Muslim Future Movement, which is allied with the Maronite Christian Lebanese Forces Party, has called for Lebanese aid to the Free Syrian Army and taking a stronger stance against the Syrian government.

This has been rejected by the ruling 8 March alliance, which includes the Shia Hezbollah and allies such as the Maronite Free Patriotic Movement, among others. In August, The Jerusalem Post reported that protesters, enraged at Hezbollah's support for Syria's government, burned Hezbollah flags and images of its leader Hassan Nasrallah in several places in Syria. Pro-government protestors countered the actions by carrying posters of Nasrallah. Hezbollah states they support a process of reforms in Syria and that they are also against U.S. plots to destabilize and interfere in Syria, amid comments by U.S. Secretary of State Hillary Clinton that it should be "abundantly clear to those who support Assad [the] 'regime' [that] its days are numbered." It was reported that, "sales of black market weapons in Lebanon have skyrocketed in recent weeks due to demand in Syria." In June 2011, clashes in the Lebanese city of Tripoli between members of the Alawite minority, loyal to Syrian President Bashar al-Assad, and members of the Sunni majority left seven people dead.

Future Movement MP Okab Sakr was long suspected to be involved in aiding the insurgents in the Syrian civil war. At first he denied his involvement, but admitted it when Al Akhbar published audio tapes of him making arms deals with Syrian insurgents. Sakr later claimed the tapes were edited, and that he only provided Syrians with milk and blankets.

Sunni extremists from Tripoli have been flocking to Syria to join the terrorist Al-Nusra Front. Hezbollah fighters have been deployed to protect border towns inhabited by Lebanese Shias from the rebels.

The Lebanese Army has attempted to disassociate itself from the conflict in Syria, and to prevent clashes within Lebanon.

Timeline

Border incidents and clashes (2011–2014)
From the inception of the violence that began in Syria as a result of the Arab Spring, the Syrian Civil War has produced and inspired a great deal of strife and unrest among armed factions. Prior to the Battle of Arsal in August 2014, the Lebanese Army has tried to keep out of it and the violence has been mostly between various factions within the country and overt Syrian involvement has been limited to airstrikes and occasional accidental incursions.

Major battles (2014–2015)

In June 2014, a joint brigade of Al-Nusra Front and ISIL militants invaded and briefly held the town of Arsal. On 2 August 2014, Al-Nusra militants raided Lebanese checkpoints and captured parts of northeastern Arsal, prompting the Lebanese Army to launch a counter-attack with Syrian air support. The Lebanese Army recaptured all of Arsal after five days of fighting with Al-Nusra and ISIL militants.

A year later, in June 2015, Hezbollah leader Hassan Nasrallah claimed that Al-Nusra and ISIL had seized territory within Lebanon and that major fighting was going on between them and Hezbollah, as well as with each other.

In September 2015, a senior commander of the Al-Nusra Front and eight other militants were killed in a joint-operation between the Lebanese Army and Hezbollah.

Recapture of Lebanese territory (2017)

By 22 June 2016, 95% of the territory once controlled by militants had been recaptured by the Lebanese Army and its allies, with only 50 km2 left under militant control. Daily clashes were ongoing mainly near the town of Arsal. On 22 September, ISIL emir Imad Yassin was arrested at the Ain al-Hilweh refugee camp. Clashes erupted between ISIL and Nusra Front in Arsal Barrens on 26 October after ISIL tried to infiltrate towards the Hamid valley. On 28 October, the Lebanese Army carried out a raid against ISIL in the Wadi Zarzour area of Jaroud 'Arsal, killing a number of militants and destroying a militant hideout. ISIL commander Ahmad Youssef Amoun was arrested along with 10 other militants on 24 November after a military operation by the Lebanese Army on a temporary headquarter of the group near Arsal.

In February 2017, negotiations between Hezbollah and Saraya Ahl al-Sham began in order to install a ceasefire in the Syria–Lebanon border and for residents to return to the contest towns and villages between Hezbollah and the rebels.

On 27 May 2017, Tahrir al-Sham and Saraya Ahl al-Sham clashed with ISIL in the western Qalamoun Mountains near Arsal. 33 fighters were killed from both sides.

On 21 July 2017, a Syrian Army commander stated that his forces and Hezbollah had launched a joint campaign to recapture the remaining territory under militant control near the Lebanon-Syria border, attacking the outskirts of Arsal. The Lebanese Army meanwhile assumed a defensive position in Arsal.

On 22 July 2017, Hezbollah officials claimed to have recaptured key points near the border, including the strategic hilltop of Dhahr al-Huwa, a former Tahrir al-Sham (al-Nusra) base.

On 27 July 2017, a three-day ceasefire agreement was reached by Hezbollah with Tahrir al-Sham and Saraya Ahl al-Sham in the Lebanese portion of the Qalamoun Mountains. The agreement called for Tahrir al-Sham forces to withdraw from Lebanon to Idlib, Saraya Ahl al-Sham forces to withdraw to the eastern Qalamoun Mountains, and exchanges of prisoners from both sides.

On 27 August 2017, the remaining ISIL holdouts in the western Qalamoun agreed to the ceasefire with the Lebanese Army in Lebanon and Hezbollah and the Syrian Army on the Syrian side of the border. The next day, ISIL fighters burned its headquarters in the area, and prepared to be transferred to Abu Kamal. With the ISIL withdrawal, the Lebanese government regained full control of Lebanese territory for the first time in six years.

Aftermath
ISIL militants killed three municipal guards in the town of Kaftoun-Koura in August 2020.

In retaliation for an earlier operation by the Lebanese Army, ISIL militants killed two Lebanese soldiers in their barracks on 27 September 2020.

Deaths and injuries

In the unrest of June 2011, at least 7 deaths were reported. A further two or three deaths occurred during the incidents of February 2012.

Between May 2012 and December 2015, violent political incidents had resulted in at least 789 fatalities and more than 2,700 injuries, mostly during the Bab al Tabbaneh–Jabal Mohsen clashes in Tripoli. In August 2014, starting with the battle of Arsal between the Lebanese Army and Sunni militants at the beginning of the month and intense fighting that included both the Syrian and Lebanese armies in and near Arsal and the Bekaa Valley at the end of the month, the fighting had reached a new and different phase. The August casualties nearly equaled half the number of the previous two years put together. 12 November 2015, bombings in Beirut killed 43 people in the deadliest event of 2015 for this conflict.

The Lebanese Army stated that by June 2016, about 500 ISIL and Nusra militants had been killed and 700 captured in the border area of Lebanon and Syria.

In December 2020, hundreds of Syrian refugees fled a makeshift camp in Miniyeh–Danniyeh District, North Governorate, Lebanon, after local youths had stormed their camp and torched tents, wounding three people, according to the United Nations High Commissioner for Refugees.

Reactions

Domestic political reactions
22 May 2012, Hezbollah deputy leader Sheikh Naim Qassem condoled Sunni Grand Mufti Mohammed Rashid Qabbani over the killings, and relayed the condolences of Hassan Nasrallah. The same day, Shadi Mawlawi, the Islamist whose arrest sparked the clashes in Tripoli, was released from custody, but Islamist protesters did not stop their sit-in protests, since they wanted 123 other Islamists freed as well. The Future Movement called for Mikati to immediately resign, claiming his cabinet had shown incapability to maintain the country's security. Lebanese Forces leader Samir Geagea accused Hezbollah of training and arming groups in Tripoli.

In August 2012, Prime Minister Najib Miqati, a native of Tripoli, issued a statement saying that "efforts to drag Lebanon more and more into the conflict in Syria when what is required is for leaders to cooperate...to protect Lebanon from the danger" and urged the international community to help prevent Lebanon from being another theater in the Syrian civil war. He added: "The cabinet work is not a priority compared to what the country is witnessing when it comes to exposure to the Syrian crisis and attempts to transfer it to Lebanon. The country is in great danger."

An Nahar cited unnamed "western diplomatic sources" as stating that these incidents were the beginning of a Salafist revolution aimed at arming the uprising in Syria. Salafists in Lebanon have often voiced their support for the uprising in Syria. The 14 March alliance also accused the Syrian government of trying to drag Lebanon into its crisis. The Future Movement's former MP Mustafa Alloush said after regular weekly meeting: "It is actually an attempt to make of Tripoli a zone of terrorism. It also aims at striking Lebanon's northern area which has welcomed and helped out the Syrian displaced." Calls by Rifaat Eid, the head of the Arab Democratic Party, for a return of the Syrian army to Tripoli to impose security in the city were rejected by Prime Minister Najib Mikati.

The Syrian Civil War and its domestic impact have furthered the polarisation of Lebanese politics. The March 14 Alliance, dominated by Christian- and Sunni-based parties, is broadly sympathetic to the Syrian opposition to Bashar Al-Assad. In August, youth members of 14 March parties including Kataeb, Lebanese Forces, National Liberal Party, Future Movement and Islamic Group held a rally to demand the expulsion of the Syrian Ambassador. 8 March parties generally supported the continuation of the Assad government, but analysts believe some groups within the coalition may seek new alliances if the Assad government falls. More moderate members of the coalition in government have begun distancing themselves from the Assad government.

Previously allied with Assad, the Progressive Socialist Party of Walid Jumblatt have taken an anti-Assad stance.

As of 13 February 2013, more than 182,938 Syrian refugees are in Lebanon. As the number of Syrian refugees increases, the Lebanese Forces Party, the Kataeb Party, and the Free Patriotic Movement fear the country's sectarian based political system is being undermined. Other parties, such as the mostly Shia Lebanese Option Gathering and the mostly Sunni Najjadeh Party have also taken stances close to 14 March, including calling cancellation of agreements between the two countries.

International
 : On 21 May 2012, Secretary-General Ban Ki-moon appealed for calm after the clashes. On 22 August 2012, Under-Secretary-General for Political Affairs Jeffrey Feltman, in a meeting of the Security Council, described the situation as "precarious" and warned that a deteriorating situation in Syria could destabilise Lebanon.
 : On 23 May 2012, Foreign Minister Sergei Lavrov said there was a real threat of conflict spilling over from Syria and that it could have a very bad ending.
 : On 23 May 2012, King Abdullah wrote to Lebanese President Michel Suleiman expressing concern over the recent violence in Tripoli, especially the sectarian nature of the violence.
 : On 25 May 2012, Secretary of State Hillary Clinton called for restraint and said the U.S. was concerned the unrest in Syria would contribute instability in Lebanon. In May, Ambassador Maura Connelly met with Lebanese Prime Minister Najib Mikati to express her concern with the security situation in Tripoli and commended the government's efforts to defuse the situation.

Other
Bilal Saab, a senior fellow at the Middle East Institute, argued that Lebanon's handling of the Syrian crisis was a good sign for the domestic stability of the country and U.S. policies. He noted that while the 2007 Lebanon conflict saw a mere 450 gunmen in one refugee camp kill or wound several hundred Lebanese security forces and force the government to reduce the camp to rubble to flush them out, the Syrian war spillover was dealt with much more cleanly and efficiently, with the Lebanese Army swiftly defeating and evicting a force of several thousand Islamic State militants. In addition to noting the large improvements in troop and equipment quality over the preceding decade (partly thanks to American funding), Saab also noted that the battles solidified the legitimacy of the Lebanese Army as a defender of the country, earning it positive publicity among the country's northern regions and detracting from the influence of Hezbollah.

Gallery

See also

 Bab al-Tabbaneh–Jabal Mohsen conflict
 Lebanon–Syria border
 Syrians in Lebanon

References

Syrian civil war spillover in Lebanon
Lebanon–Syria relations
Politics of Lebanon
Lebanese involvement in the Syrian civil war
Spillover of the Syrian civil war
2012 in Lebanon
2013 in Lebanon
2014 in Lebanon
2015 in Lebanon
2016 in Lebanon
2017 in Lebanon
2020 in Lebanon
Conflicts in 2012
Conflicts in 2013
Conflicts in 2014
Conflicts in 2015
Conflicts in 2016
Conflicts in 2017
Conflicts in 2020
Arab Winter in Lebanon
Wars involving the Islamic State of Iraq and the Levant
Wars involving Syria
Wars involving Lebanon
Iran–Saudi Arabia relations
Iran–Saudi Arabia proxy conflict
Articles containing video clips